15th Wolves Infantry Regiment (Polish language: 15 Pulk Piechoty Wilkow, 15 pp) was an infantry regiment of the Polish Army. It existed from January 1919 until September 1939. Garrisoned first in Bochnia and Ostrow Mazowiecka, and finally in Dęblin (1921–1939), the unit belonged to the 28th Infantry Division from Warsaw.

Beginnings 

In December 1918 in Bochnia, Colonel Ludwik Piatkowski, together with Major Jozef Wolf, formed the Infantry Regiment of the Land of Bochnia. On January 1, 1919, Colonel Wilhelm Frys became first commandant of the new unit. Soon afterwards, its name was changed into the 15th Infantry Regiment.

On March 13, 1919, 1st Battalion of the Regiment (16 officers and 436 soldiers), which consisted mostly of volunteers from the counties of Bochnia, Grybow and Gorlice, left for the Ukrainian front. At the same time, two additional battalions were formed.

On June 1, 1919, new commandant, Colonel Rudolf Tarnawski, completed all battalions, and in mid-August the whole regiment was sent to the Soviet front. On July 3, 1920, Major Boleslaw Zaleski, in honour of the ferocity of its soldiers facing the enemy, nicknamed the unit the “Wolf Regiment”.

The 15th Wolves Infantry Regiment fought with distinction in the Polish-Ukrainian War and the Polish-Soviet War. It captured 5 cannons, 100 machine guns, 1500 POWs, 100 horses and stocks of enemy equipment, together with a Soviet flag.

Second Polish Republic 
Following the Polish-Soviet War, the regiment remained for a year in eastern Poland, guarding the newly established border between the two countries. Finally, in mid-August 1921, it was transported to Dęblin, where it stayed until September 1939.

During the 1939 Invasion of Poland, the 15th Wolves Infantry Regiment belonged to the 28th Infantry Division from Warsaw.

Commandants 
 Colonel Wilhelm Frys (1919),
 Colonel Rudolf Tarnawski (1 VI – 4 X 1919),
 Major Jozef Wolf (1919),
 Colonel Romuald Dàbrowski (1919–1920),
 Major Jozef Wolf (1920),
 Major Boleslaw Zaleski (1920),
 Major Edward Dojan-Surowka (1921),
 Colonel Antoni Kaminski (1923),
 Colonel Romuald Kohutnicki (1923–1925),
 Colonel Ludwik Lichtarowicz (1925–1927),
 Colonel Jan Jagmin-Sadowski (1928 -1931),
 Colonel Wladyslaw Mikolajczak (1935–1038),
 Colonel Wladyslaw Fraczek (1938 – 3 IX 1939),
 Major Walerian Wielezynski (3 IX – 6 IX 1939),
 Major Jozef Ratajczak (since 6 IX 1939).

Symbols 
The flag of the regiment, purchased by the residents of Bochnia, was handed to its soldiers in Molodeczno, on August 6, 1921.

The badge, approved in June 1932, was in the shape of the Knight's Cross, with four heads of wolves on the wings.

On December 4, 1920 near Lida, Marshall Jozef Pilsudski decorated the flags of the 9th Infantry Division (together with the 15th Wolves Infantry Regiment, which belonged to that division) with the Virtuti Militari.

The regiment celebrated its holiday on September 5, the anniversary of the 1920 Battle of Stefankowice.

Sources 
 Kazimierz Satora: Opowieści wrześniowych sztandarów. Warszawa: Instytut Wydawniczy Pax, 1990
 Zdzisław Jagiełło: Piechota Wojska Polskiego 1918–1939. Warszawa: Bellona, 2007

See also 
 1939 Infantry Regiment (Poland)

Infantry regiments of Poland
Military units and formations established in 1918
Military units and formations disestablished in 1939
Military units and formations of Poland in World War II
Polish Legions in World War I